The National Federation of Sharecroppers and Smallholders (Federcoltivatori) was a trade union representing self-employed farmers in Italy.

The union was established in 1950 and affiliated to the Italian Confederation of Workers' Trade Unions, and the International Federation of Plantation and Agricultural Workers.  For many years, it was led by Carlo Ceruti.

Membership of the union was 102,688 in 1954, and 114,983 in 1982.  The following year, it became part of the new General Union of Growers.

References

Agriculture and forestry trade unions
Trade unions established in 1950
Trade unions disestablished in 1983
Trade unions in Italy